Bugadze is a Georgian surname. Notable people with the surname include:

Gia Bugadze (born 1956), contemporary Georgian artist
Lasha Bugadze (born 1977), Georgian novelist and playwright

Georgian-language surnames